Balitora lancangjiangensis is a species of hill-stream loach from the Mekong and Red River basins. Sources differ in distribution, but all list Yunnan (China) and Laos, and at least the International Union for Conservation of Nature also lists Vietnam, Burma, and Thailand.

Balitora vanlongi might be junior synonym of Balitora lancangjiangensis.

Balitora lancangjiangensis grow to  SL. It occurs in fast flowing stretches of waters in rivers and large streams.

References

L
Fish of the Mekong Basin
Fish of Myanmar
Freshwater fish of China
Fish of Laos
Fish of Thailand
Fish of Vietnam
Fish described in 1980